Larry Lacewell (February 12, 1937 – May 17, 2022) was an American football player, coach, scout, and college athletics administrator.  He served as the head football coach at Arkansas State University from 1979 to 1989, compiling a record of 69–58–4.  Lacewell was later the longtime director of scouting for the Dallas Cowboys of the National Football League.

Early years
Lacewell was a native of Fordyce, Arkansas. He attended Fordyce High School, where he played halfback. He accepted a football scholarship from Arkansas A&M College. As a junior, he was named second-team All-AIC at running back.

In 2003, he was inducted into the University of Arkansas at Monticello Sports Hall of Fame.

Professional career
Lacewell began his coaching career as a graduate assistant for Bear Bryant at the University of Alabama. He then moved on to coach at Arkansas State (1961), Arkansas A&M (1962-1963), Kilgore Junior College (1964-1965, winning the NJCAA National Football Championship), Oklahoma (1966), Wichita State (1967) and Iowa State (1968), before becoming defensive coordinator at Oklahoma in 1969. Lacewell became assistant head coach under Barry Switzer in 1973, and the teams won six Big Eight titles and two national championships in the ensuing years.

As the athletic director and head coach at Arkansas State University from 1978 to 1989. He compiled a record of 69-58-4, while capturing two Southland Conference titles and being named the conference's Coach of the Year on three occasions. He also led the program to four consecutive appearances in the NCAA Division I-AA playoffs, with the 1986 team making it all the way to the championship game before losing to Georgia Southern. He left as the winningest coach in school history.

In 1990, he became the defensive coordinator for the Tennessee Volunteers under Johnny Majors. He contributed to the program winning the SEC Championship and defeating the University of Virginia in the Sugar Bowl. In 1991, the team finished second in the SEC and received a Fiesta Bowl invitation.

In 1987, he was inducted into the Arkansas State Athletics Hall of Honor. In 1996, he was inducted into the Arkansas Sports Hall of Fame.

Personal life
On May 21, 1992, he joined the Dallas Cowboys as the Director of College Scouting, replacing Dick Mansperger. In the Spring of 1994, he was named the Director of College and Pro Scouting, adding the responsibility of coordinating the scouting efforts of all pro personnel.

After head coach Jimmy Johnson left the franchise on March 28, 1994, the subsequent drafts made by the Cowboys came under heavy scrutiny in the media and with the fans, as they were never able to replenish the talent base and holdovers of the Super Bowl teams of the early 1990s. In January 2005, two seasons after the arrival of head coach Bill Parcells, he retired and moved into a talent consultant role, while being replaced by Jeff Ireland, who was promoted to Vice President of Pro and College Scouting.

Lacewell resided in Jonesboro, Arkansas, with his wife, Criss. He died on May 18, 2022.

Head coaching record

References

1937 births
2022 deaths
American football halfbacks
Alabama Crimson Tide football coaches
Arkansas State Red Wolves athletic directors
Arkansas State Red Wolves football coaches
Arkansas–Monticello Boll Weevils football coaches
Arkansas–Monticello Boll Weevils football players
Dallas Cowboys scouts
Dallas Cowboys executives
Iowa State Cyclones football coaches
Oklahoma Sooners football coaches
Tennessee Volunteers football coaches
Wichita State Shockers football coaches
Junior college football coaches in the United States
People from Fordyce, Arkansas
Coaches of American football from Arkansas
Players of American football from Arkansas